Kallarali Hoovagi is a 2006 Indian Kannada historical drama romance film directed by T. S. Nagabharana, based on a novel of the same name written by B. L. Venu. Set in 1772, during the reign of Madakari Nayaka, the last ruler of Chitradurga, it features a fictitious love story between a Hindu Veerashaiva boy and a Muslim girl. The film stars Vijay Raghavendra, Umashankari, Anant Nag, Bharathi, Ambareesh, Avinash.

At the 54th National Film Awards, the film won Nargis Dutt Award for Best Feature Film on National Integration. It also won multiple awards at the 2006–07 Karnataka State Film Awards. Upon theatrical release on 22 December 2006, the film received widespread critical acclaim and also emerged as a box-office success.

The core plot of the 2015 Hindi film Bajrangi Bhaijaan was thematically same as this movie.

Plot
A young Hindu boy (belonging to a caste primarily considered vegetarian) staying in a Hindu dominated kingdom finds a dumb Muslim girl belonging to Muslim dominated neighbouring enemy kingdom. He gives her shelter in his Hindu family without knowing her background. When he realizes that she is a non-vegetarian, he provides her with biryani secretly in spite of him being vegetarian. Then he realizes that she is Muslim while she is offering prayers but hides it from his parents. When it comes to fore that she belongs to enemy kingdom, he faces opposition from a senior family member. He decides to personally send her back to her hometown safely. Though he escapes the security at the borders, he gets caught in the enemy kingdom as she reaches home and is sentenced to death by hanging. However, he is pardoned after the girl regains her lost voice in the climax.

Cast

Soundtrack

Hamsalekha composed the film's background score and music for its soundtrack, also writing its lyrics. The soundtrack album consists of 12 tracks.

Critical reception
"Kallarali Hoovaagi" got very good critical reaction. Most newspapers and websites hailed it as an exceptional film.

Awards
54th National Film Awards
 Nargis Dutt Award for Best Feature Film on National Integration
2006–07 Karnataka State Film Awards
 Best Editor – Basavaraj Urs
 Best Art Direction – Vittal
 Special Jury Award (Costume Design) – Nagini Bharana, Roshni Dinaker

See also
Janumada Jodi

References

External links
 
 

2006 films
Films shot in Chitradurga
2000s Kannada-language films
Indian historical drama films
Films based on Indian novels
Films scored by Hamsalekha
Best Film on National Integration National Film Award winners
2000s historical drama films
2006 drama films
Films directed by T. S. Nagabharana